The US/Australia Parliamentary Friendship Group is a group of elected members of the Parliament of Australia whose aim is to "foster even stronger relations between the two countries (Australia and U.S.) and their elected representatives". 

The Chairperson is Michael Danby MP (Melbourne Ports, Australian Labor Party) in the Australian House of Representatives. 

The membership encompasses around 40% of the elected representatives, across most political parties, blocks, and groups. 

The corresponding group in the U.S. Congress is the Friends of Australia Congressional Caucus.

See also
 Australia–United States relations
 Friends of Australia Congressional Caucus

External links
US/A-PFG Australian web site
Mr Michael Danby MP official site

Australia–United States relations
Parliament of Australia
Australia friendship associations
United States friendship associations
Issue-based groups of legislators